Horace Harmon Lurton (February 26, 1844 – July 12, 1914) was an Associate Justice of the Supreme Court of the United States and previously was a United States circuit judge of the United States Court of Appeals for the Sixth Circuit and of the United States Circuit Courts for the Sixth Circuit.

Early life

Lurton was born on February 26, 1844, in Newport, Kentucky. He attended the Old University of Chicago, then received a Bachelor of Laws in 1867 from Cumberland School of Law (then part of Cumberland University, now part of Samford University).

He served in the Confederate States Army as a Sergeant Major with the 5th Tennessee Infantry, 2nd Kentucky Infantry and 3rd Kentucky Cavalry from 1861 to 1865. He was twice captured by Union forces, the second time sent as a prisoner of war to Johnson's Island Prison Camp in Sandusky Bay, Ohio. He claimed he was later paroled by President Lincoln because of pleas for mercy from his mother but this was merely an anecdote he often repeated to dinner guests, according to historian Roger Long. Mr. Long explains in detail what the evidence shows in an article he wrote in the December 1994 edition of Civil War Times. According to Mr. Long, apparently he was paroled from Johnson's Island only when he signed the oath of allegiance, not because of any act of the president. Mr Long's article includes interesting details about Lurton's service as well as possible reasons for the anecdote he was so fond of repeating.

He entered private practice in Clarksville, Tennessee from 1867 to 1875. He was Chancellor for the Tennessee Chancery Court for the Sixth Judicial District from 1875 to 1878. He resumed private practice in Clarksville from 1878 to 1886. He was a justice of the Tennessee Supreme Court from 1886 to 1893.

U.S. Circuit Court

Lurton was nominated by President Grover Cleveland on March 22, 1893, to a joint seat on the United States Court of Appeals for the Sixth Circuit and the United States Circuit Courts for the Sixth Circuit vacated by Judge Howell Edmunds Jackson. He was confirmed by the United States Senate on March 27, 1893, and received his commission the same day. His service terminated on December 20, 1909, due to his elevation to the Supreme Court.

Concurrent with his service on the Sixth Circuit, Lurton served as Dean of the law department of Vanderbilt University from 1905 to 1909.

U.S. Supreme Court

On December 13, 1909, President William Howard Taft nominated Lurton as an associate justice of the United States Supreme Court, to succeed Rufus W. Peckham. He was confirmed by the Senate on December 20, 1909, and was sworn into office on January 3, 1910.

He was Circuit Justice for the Second Circuit from January 10, 1910, until January 8, 1911, Circuit Justice for the Third Circuit from January 9, 1911, until March 17, 1912, and Circuit Justice for the Seventh Circuit from March 18, 1912, until July 12, 1914. His service terminated on July 12, 1914, due to his death in Atlantic City, New Jersey.

Lurton sided most frequently on the court with Associate Justice Oliver Wendell Holmes Jr., a progressive Supreme Court justice. The most notable opinion he authored was probably the opinion of the Court in Coyle v. Smith, 221 U.S. 559 (1911), which held that the federal government could not tell a state where to locate its capital, as all states must be on "equal footing."

Death

Lurton's tenure on the Court was brief, as he served only four years before dying in Atlantic City, New Jersey of a heart attack on July 12, 1914. He is buried in Greenwood Cemetery in Clarksville, Tennessee.

Legacy and honors

During World War II the Liberty ship  was built in Brunswick, Georgia, and named in his honor.

See also
List of justices of the Supreme Court of the United States

Notes

References

Further reading

 Irons, Peter.  A People's History of the Supreme Court, p. 260. Penguin Books, 2000. Peter Irons wrote critically of Lurton's lack of impact on American Constitutional Law, even though Lurton only served on the High Court for four years before his death.

External links

 
 

1844 births
1914 deaths
19th-century American judges
20th-century American judges
American Civil War prisoners of war
Confederate States Army soldiers
Cumberland School of Law alumni
Judges of the United States Court of Appeals for the Sixth Circuit
Deans of law schools in the United States
People from Newport, Kentucky
Tennessee Democrats
Tennessee lawyers
Justices of the Tennessee Supreme Court
Vanderbilt University Law School faculty
United States federal judges appointed by Grover Cleveland
United States federal judges appointed by William Howard Taft
Justices of the Supreme Court of the United States